Guyandot or Guyandotte are alternate spellings of Wyandot, a group of native North Americans also known as the Hurons. 

Guyandot or Guyandotte may also refer to:

USS Guyandot (AOG-16)
Guyandotte, Huntington, West Virginia
Guyandotte River in West Virginia